A list of fantasy films released in the 1980s.

List

References

1980s
Lists of 1980s films by genre